Disposable tableware includes all disposable tableware like 
disposable cups made of paper, plastic, coated paper,
plates
tablecloths, 
placemats
plastic cutlery,
paper napkins, etc.

These products are prevalent in fast food restaurants, takeaways, but also for airline meals. In private settings, this kind of disposable products has proven very popular with consumers who prefer easy and quick cleanup after parties, etc.

The marketing for disposable tableware is huge, with an estimated $7.5 billion in 2012 in the US alone.

Kulhar

A kulhar  is a traditional handle-less clay cup from South Asia that is typically unpainted and unglazed, and meant to be disposable. Since kulhars are made by firing in a kiln and are almost never reused, they are inherently sterile and hygienic. Bazaars and food stalls in the Indian subcontinent traditionally served hot beverages, such as tea, in kuhlars, which suffused the beverage with an "earthy aroma" that was often considered appealing. Yoghurt, hot milk with sugar as well as some regional desserts, such as kulfi (traditional ice-cream), are also served in kulhars. Kulhars have gradually given way to polystyrene and coated paper cups, because the latter are lighter to carry in bulk and cheaper.⁠⁠

Environmental impacts 
As is the case for disposable cups, materials used are usually paper, plastic (including expanded polystyrene foam), or plastic-coated paper. Recycling rates are especially low for paper-based products, especially when soiled with (wet and / or oily) scraps due to diminished recyclate quality. The waste problem is aggravated by the fact that most of the utilities themselves come in plastic and thus disposable packaging.

Efforts are made to introduce biodegradable materials like sugarcane, bamboo, wheat straw, palm leaves, or various types of flours (rice, wheat and sorghum). Nevertheless, biodegradable and composable plastics often do not break down in landfill environments.

See also

Disposable food packaging
Criticism of fast food
Edible tableware

References

Disposable products
Tableware